The R154 road is a regional road in Ireland, linking the R147 near Clonee, County Meath to Crossdoney (near Cavan) in County Cavan. The road is single carriageway throughout. Many parts of the route have dangerous bends.

Route
The route passes through small settlements and townlands, including Kiltale, on the way to Trim. At Trim, the route bypasses the town centre along the Inner Relief Road, with junctions to the R160, R158 and R161. From Trim the R154 runs north to meet the N51 at Athboy.

The route leaves the N51 on the west side of Athboy, and runs north to cross the N52 just south of Kilskeer. The route continues north/northwest to Oldcastle, meeting the R163 along the way, just north of Crossakeel. At Oldcastle the R154 crosses the R195. The route continues northeast through Mount Nugent in County Cavan, joining the R194 after that at a staggered junction. The route leaves the R194, continuing northeast through Kilnaleck, and across the N55 at Ballinagh.

See also
Roads in Ireland
National primary road
National secondary road

References
Roads Act 1993 (Classification of Regional Roads) Order 2006 – Department of Transport

Regional roads in the Republic of Ireland
Roads in County Meath
Roads in County Cavan